Posyolok Anatoliya Zvereva is a rural locality (a settlement) in Ikryaninsky District, Astrakhan Oblast, Russia. The population was 518 as of 2010. There are 11 streets.

Geography 
Posyolok Anatoliya Zvereva is located 8 km northeast of Ikryanoye (the district's administrative centre) by road. Bakhtemir is the nearest rural locality.

References 

Rural localities in Ikryaninsky District